Bruce Lewis Helford (born January 28, 1952) is an American television writer and producer.

Career 
Helford was the co-creator of The Drew Carey Show. He served as executive producer of the series for its entire run, from 1995 to 2004. Helford also served as executive producer and writer for Roseanne during season five of the series (1992–1993). He also created or co-created the series The Norm Show, Wanda at Large, Freddie, George Lopez, Nikki, and Bless This House.

In 1991, Helford launched Mohawk Productions to produce shows created or executive produced by him. Mohawk is famous for its logo, consisting of an Ultrasound baby, who happens to be Bruce Helford's son, Aven Helford. Mohawk is affiliated with Warner Bros. Television. Anger Management starring Charlie Sheen premiered in 2012 on cable channel FX. In 2016, Helford co-created the CBS sitcom Kevin Can Wait and served as the series' showrunner for the first thirteen episodes before leaving the show that November due to creative differences. Most recently, he was showrunner and one of several executive producers of the revived tenth season of Roseanne and co-creator and executive producer of the spin-off series The Conners.

Filmography

Television

References

External links

American television producers
American television writers
American male television writers
Living people
1952 births
Showrunners